Basilius Monner (1500 - 16 January 1566 in Jena) was a German jurist.

Life 

Monner joined the Order of Saint Augustine in his youth. He enrolled at the University of Wittenburg at the height of the Reformation. In 1524, Monner became the Rector of the Gotha Gymnasium. He was active in this office for eleven years and graduated with a master's degree in the seven liberal arts in Jena.  He later left Jena for the Wittenberg Academy in 1527 due to the plague.

In 1535, Monner began to study law at the Wittenberg University. He travelled to France during this time in 1538 as an envoy of the Protestants, and returned to Wittenberg on October 11, 1538, where he received his doctorate on January 16, 1539. In February 1539 he became a member of the newly-founded Wittenburg Consistory, the first of its kind. The institution was the origin of all evangelical consistories and courts of marriage.

His work in the Consistory, however, was short-lived. On October 10, 1539 he began to counsel Johann Friedrich of Saxony, and became the educator of his sons. With this, he experienced - among other things - the defeat of the electoral line of Ernestine in the Battle of Mühlberg and the Capitulation of Wittenberg. After Monner finished the training of Duke John Frederick II, Duke of Saxony on 30 September 1554, he went to the newly established Gymnasium in Jena as a professor of law in the autumn of 1554.

Here, he worked alongside Gregor Brück, the regent of Saxony. As a participant in the Colloquy of Worms (1557), he experienced the founding of the University of Jena on 15 August 1557. After taking up teaching duties on February 2, 1558, he became one of the first teachers at the faculty of law, along with Matthias Wesenbeck. Monner worked specifically in the area of the Protestant marriage law. He understood how to combine the traditional foundations of the canon law with the new requirements of the Reformation and used the two in order to formulate his beliefs.

As a person, he is described by contemporary witnesses as vain, domineering, zealous, and intriguing. As a religious fanatic of pure Lutheran doctrine, he had supported the opinion of Matthias Flacius primarily as a Gnesio-Lutheran.

Works 
 Tractatus de matrimonio et clandestinis conjugiis. Jena 1561, 1603 (Online)
 De clandestinis conjugiis. Jena 1604
 Quod Defensio Sit Ex Lege Naturale. Von der Defension und Gegenwehr, ob man sich wieder der Obrigkeit Tyranny und unrecht Gewalt mit … 1546, 1632
 De matrimonio breuis et methodica explicatio. 1561
 Orationes tres pro legibus. Frankfurt 1560

References 
 Eyk Ueberschär: Basilius Monner (um 1500 bis 6. Januar 1566) – Ein treuer Diener seiner Herren, In: Rechtsgelehrte der Universität Jena aus vier Jahrhunderten; Hrsg. Gerhard Lingelbach, Bussert und Stadeler Jena 2011, S. 5 ff.
 Max Vollert: Basilius Monner, der erste Rechtslehrer an der Universität Jena. In: Zeitschrift des Vereins für Thüringische Geschichte und Altertumskunde Jg. 30. G. Fischer, 1932, S. 41–51 (Online)
 Otto Clemen: Basilius Monner = Zwei Briefe von Basilius Monner. In: Mitteilungen der Vereinigung für gothaische Geschichte und Altertumsforschung. Gesellschaft des Osterlandes, Altenburg 1912
 Johann Jakob Günter: Lebenskizzen der Professoren der Universität Jena seit 1558 bis 1858. S. 49 ( GoogleBooks)
 
 H. Koch: Professor Basilius Monner, 1566 - Zu seinem 375. Todestage am 16. Januar - 1941. Manuskriptabdruck der Beilage Altes und Neues aus der Heimat eines Sonderdrucks des Jenaer Volksblatts (Online)
 Max Schneider: Zur Geschichte des Gymnasiums Illustre in Gotha. 5. Beitrag Basilius Monnerus der erste Rekor des Gothaer Gymnasiums (1524-1524). In: Aus der Heimat. Blätter der Vereinigung für Gothaische Geschichte und Altertumsforschung. Friedrich Andreas Perthes, Gotha, 1898, S. 98, (Online)
 Johann Caspar Zeumer, Christoph Weissenborn: Vitae Professorum Theologiae, Jurisprudentiae, Medicinae et Philosophiae qui in illustri Academia Jenensi, ab ipsius fundatione ad nostra usque tempora vixerunt et adhuc vivunt una cum scriptis a quolibet editis quatuor classibus. Johann Felici Bieleck, Jena, 1711, S. 11 (Juristen, Online)

Specific

External links 
 Druckschriften von Basilius Monner im VD 16

1500 births
1566 deaths
Jurists from Thuringia
16th-century German jurists
Heads of the Ernestine Gymnasium, Gotha